Caltrain is a commuter rail transit system that serves the San Francisco Peninsula and the Santa Clara Valley in the U.S. state of California. It is operated under contract by TransitAmerica Services and funded jointly by the City and County of San Francisco, San Mateo County Transit District (SamTrans), and Santa Clara Valley Transportation Authority (VTA) through the Peninsula Corridor Joint Powers Board (PCJPB). The system's average mid-weekday ridership is 65,095 as of February 2018.

The original railroad between San Francisco and San Jose (known as the Peninsula Commute) was built by the San Francisco and San Jose Rail Road in 1863. In 1870 the railroad was acquired by Southern Pacific. Southern Pacific double tracked the line in 1904. In 1958 the railroad had record ridership, 7.5 million passengers. The popularity of the railroad began to decline and in 1977 Southern Pacific petitioned to the state government to discontinue Peninsula Commute. After months of negotiation, the California Department of Transportation (Caltrans) reached an agreement with the three counties of which the Peninsula Commute ran through to continue rail operation. Under the agreement, the system was renamed Caltrain and operation responsibilities were shared by Caltrans, Southern Pacific and the three counties. The Peninsula Corridor Joint Powers Board was formed in 1987, and it bought the right of way of Caltrain from Southern Pacific in late 1991 for $220 million. The PCJPB formally took over the operation of Caltrain in 1992 and contracted Amtrak to operate the system. In the same year, Caltrain extended to Gilroy. Amtrak's contract with PCJPB was renewed in 2001.

The system has 31 stations. 28 stations are served daily, one (Broadway) is served on weekends only, one (College Park) is served during Bellarmine College Preparatory's commute times on weekdays only, and one (Stanford) is served on Stanford University's football game days only. San Francisco 4th and King Street is the northern terminus of the system, while Gilroy is the southern terminus. The five southernmost stations—Capitol, Blossom Hill, Morgan Hill, San Martin, and Gilroy—are served only on weekdays during commute times, by select trains. Twelve stations are served by the express train service known as Baby Bullet, inaugurated in 2004. Seven stations (Millbrae, Burlingame, San Carlos, Menlo Park, Palo Alto, Santa Clara, and San Jose Diridon) are listed on the National Register of Historic Places.

Of the 31 stations in the system, 27 are accessible. The four that are not are, in order from north to south, 22nd Street, Broadway, Stanford, and College Park. The weekend-only Broadway station is planned to be completely rebuilt; upon completion, it would be ADA-compliant. The non-accessible Atherton station was closed on December 13, 2020. Of the four non-accessible stations in the system, only 22nd Street sees regular service. A plan to add ADA-compliant ramps to the station is being considered.



Stations

Stop patterns
Legend:

Closed stations

Notes

References
General

Specific

Caltrain stations
Caltrain stations
Caltrain
Caltrain